Valp can refer to

The Swedish name for "puppy"
The Volvo L-3314 car has the pet name "Valp" in Sweden
A Swiss comics creator, also known as Valentine Pasche